Alice is the fourteenth studio album by Tom Waits, released in 2002 on Epitaph Records (under the Anti sub-label).

Background
The album contains the majority of songs written for the play Alice. The adaptation was directed by Robert Wilson, whom Waits had previously worked with on the play The Black Rider, and originally set up at the Thalia Theatre in Hamburg in 1992. The play has since been performed in various theatres around the world.

The album was co-released with Blood Money, an album containing songs from Wilson and Waits' 2000 musical Woyzeck.

Alice was ranked #2 in Metacritic's Top 30 albums of 2002.

The songs had been released as a bootleg in several different versions called The Alice Demos many years before its official release. The source is believed to be studio recordings taken when Waits' car was broken into in late 1992.

The song "Poor Edward" is about Edward Mordake.

In 2006 it was awarded a diamond certification from the Independent Music Companies Association, which indicated sales of at least 250,000 copies throughout Europe. As of 2003, Alice has sold 140,000 copies in the U.S., according to Nielsen Soundscan.

Track listing
All tracks written by Tom Waits and Kathleen Brennan.
 "Alice" – 4:28
 "Everything You Can Think" – 3:10
 "Flower's Grave" – 3:28
 "No One Knows I'm Gone" – 1:42
 "Kommienezuspadt" – 3:10
 "Poor Edward" – 3:42
 "Table Top Joe" – 4:14
 "Lost in the Harbour" – 3:45
 "We're All Mad Here" – 2:31
 "Watch Her Disappear" – 2:33
 "Reeperbahn" – 4:02
 "I'm Still Here" – 1:49
 "Fish & Bird" – 3:59
 "Barcarolle" – 3:59
 "Fawn" – 1:43 (Instrumental)

Personnel
Adapted from the album liner notes.

Musicians
Tim Allen – scraper (5)
Ara Anderson – trumpet (1, 13), horns (11, 13)
Myles Boisen – banjo (11)
Andrew Borger – oil drums (5), frame drum (5), percussion (5)
Matt Brubeck – cello (2-6, 8, 10, 12, 13), bass (14)
Bent Clausen – Swiss hand bells (2), piano (7), piano solo (14)
Stewart Copeland – trap kit (7)  
Joe Gore – electric guitar (7)
Dawn Harms – violin (3, 4, 10, 12-14), Stroh violin (4, 6, 8, 13)
Carla Kihlstedt – violin (8, 9, 11, 15)
Eric Perney – bass (1)
Nik Phelps – French horn (2), trumpet (2)
Bebe Risenfors – Stroh violin (2), viola (3, 4, 6), clarinet (3, 5, 13), Baby Bass (5, 7), marimba (5), percussion (5), fiddle (8)  
Gino Robair – drums (1), percussion (9, 11), marimba (15)
Matthew Sperry – bass (9, 11, 14, 15)
Colin Stetson – saxophone (1, 5, 14), clarinet  (9, 11, 12, 15)
Larry Taylor – bass (2-8, 13), electric guitar (2), acoustic guitar (5, 7), percussion (5)
Tom Waits – vocals, piano (1, 3, 6, 9, 11-15), Mellotron (2), Chamberlin vibraphone (2, 14), pod shaker (2, 5), pump organ (3, 4, 7, 8, 10, 13), stomp (5), circular violin (9), Chamberlin (11), toy glockenspiel (13), cymbal  (14)

Technical
Jeff Abarta – art direction
Gerd Bessler – engineer (8)
Kathleen Brennan – producer
Richard Fisher – studio support   
Oz Fritz – engineer (1-11, 13, 15), mixing
Jacquire King – engineer (12, 14), mixing (3, 8)
Matt Mahurin – photography, concept  
Ralfinoe – design
Doug Sax – mastering
Jeff Sloan – second engineer
Tom Waits – producer

Charts

Weekly charts

Year-end charts

Certifications

References

Music based on Alice in Wonderland
2002 soundtrack albums
Theatre soundtracks
Tom Waits soundtracks
Anti- (record label) soundtracks

it:Alice#Musica